Dame N'Doye (born 21 February 1985) is a Senegalese former professional footballer who played as a forward.

He spent the better part of his career with Copenhagen, serving two spells at the club and becoming its all-time topscorer in 2018. He also represented teams in Qatar, Portugal, Greece, Russia, England and Turkey.

N'Doye won his first cap for Senegal in 2010, and played for the country in two Africa Cup of Nations tournaments.

Club career

Early years
Born in Thiès, N'Doye began his career with ASC Jeanne d'Arc. In 2006, he signed for Al Sadd SC in the Qatar Stars League.

N'Doye arrived in Europe in the summer of 2006, joining Académica de Coimbra. From 2007 to 2009 he competed in the Super League Greece, with Panathinaikos F.C. and OFI Crete FC.

Copenhagen
On 12 January 2009, N'Doye moved to Danish Superliga club F.C. Copenhagen. He scored his first goal on 7 March 2009, helping to a 3–0 away win over Randers FC, and finished his first full season with 14 goals, as the club renewed its domestic supremacy.

On 4 August 2010, N'Doye netted the 3–2 winner (also the aggregate score) in the 59th minute of the playoff round of the UEFA Champions League against FC BATE Borisov. In the group stage, he helped his team become the first ever in the country to reach the knockout stages with goals against FC Rubin Kazan (1–0, home) and Panathinaikos (2–0 in Athens).

Lokomotiv Moscow
In the summer of 2012, N'Doye signed with Russian Premier League side FC Lokomotiv Moscow for an undisclosed fee. He quickly became first-choice, scoring seven times in the first half of the campaign; in November 2012, he won a web poll conducted by club fans to be elected player of the month, repeating the feat in October of the following year.

Hull City
On 2 February 2015, transfer deadline day, N'Doye agreed to a two-and-a-half-year contract with Hull City for an undisclosed fee. He made his Premier League debut five days later, coming on as a 76th-minute substitute for Gastón Ramírez in a 1–1 draw at Manchester City. His first start occurred the following matchday, where he scored the second goal in a 2–0 home defeat of Aston Villa.

Trabzonspor
On 10 August 2015, N'Doye moved to Trabzonspor for £2.2 million. In the following January transfer window he moved clubs and countries again, joining Sunderland until the end of the season. He scored his first goal for the latter on 1 March, converting through a deflected shot to put the hosts ahead in an eventual 2–2 home draw against Crystal Palace.

Return to Copenhagen
On 2 July 2018, free agent N'Doye returned to F.C. Copenhagen on a one-year deal. 27 days later, in a match against Aalborg Boldspilklub at Parken Stadium that finished 4–0, he scored a hat-trick in just 15 minutes to become the club's all-time topscorer, after surpassing César Santin.

N'Doye left in the summer of 2020 as his contract, renewed in January 2019, expired.

International career
N'Doye made his debut for Senegal on 17 November 2010, in a 2–1 friendly win against Gabon. He was part of the squad that competed in the 2012 Africa Cup of Nations, scoring as a substitute in a 2–1 loss to Zambia in an eventual group stage exit.

Personal life
N'Doye's older brother, Ousmane, was also an international footballer.

Career statistics

Club

International goals
Scores and results list Senegal's goal tally first, score column indicates score after each N'Doye goal.

Honours
Copenhagen
Danish Superliga: 2008–09, 2009–10, 2010–11, 2018–19
Danish Cup: 2008–09, 2011–12

Individual
Danish Superliga top scorer: 2010–11, 2011–12
List of 33 top players of the Russian Premier League: 2013–14

References

External links

Lokomotiv Moscow official profile 

1985 births
Living people
Sportspeople from Thiès
Senegalese footballers
Association football forwards
ASC Jeanne d'Arc players
Qatar Stars League players
Al Sadd SC players
Primeira Liga players
Associação Académica de Coimbra – O.A.F. players
Super League Greece players
Panathinaikos F.C. players
OFI Crete F.C. players
Danish Superliga players
F.C. Copenhagen players
Russian Premier League players
FC Lokomotiv Moscow players
Premier League players
Hull City A.F.C. players
Sunderland A.F.C. players
Süper Lig players
Trabzonspor footballers
Senegal international footballers
2012 Africa Cup of Nations players
2015 Africa Cup of Nations players
Senegalese expatriate footballers
Expatriate footballers in Qatar
Expatriate footballers in Portugal
Expatriate footballers in Greece
Expatriate men's footballers in Denmark
Expatriate footballers in Russia
Expatriate footballers in England
Expatriate footballers in Turkey
Senegalese expatriate sportspeople in Qatar
Senegalese expatriate sportspeople in Portugal
Senegalese expatriate sportspeople in Greece
Senegalese expatriate sportspeople in Denmark
Senegalese expatriate sportspeople in Russia
Senegalese expatriate sportspeople in England
Senegalese expatriate sportspeople in Turkey